Hosker is a surname. Notable people with the surname include:

Bobby Hosker (born 1955), British footballer
Gerald Hosker (born 1933), British lawyer and public servant

See also
Hosmer (surname)